Travis Demsey is an Australian musician who served as the former drummer for The Living End from May 1996 to February 2002. He currently works as a youth worker and is the drummer for the Melbourne band Double Black and Striped Black.

References

Year of birth missing (living people)
Living people
Australian punk rock musicians
Australian rock drummers
Male drummers
The Living End members